Cinnamomum is a genus of evergreen aromatic trees and shrubs belonging to the laurel family, Lauraceae. The species of Cinnamomum have aromatic oils in their leaves and bark. The genus contains approximately 250 species, distributed in tropical and subtropical regions of South Asia, Southeast Asia, East Asia, Oceania, and Australasia. The genus includes a great number of economically important trees.

Habitat
This genus is present in the Himalayas and other mountain areas and is present in tropical and subtropical montane rainforests, in the weed-tree forests, in valleys, and mixed forests of coniferous and deciduous broad-leaved trees, from southern China, India, and Southeast Asia. Some species, such as Cinnamomum camphora, tolerate drought.

Characteristics
All species tested so far are diploid, with the total number of chromosomes being 24.
This Lauraceae genus comprises approximately 250 trees and shrubs and most are aromatic. Some trees produce sprouts. The thick, leathery leaves are dark green, lauroid type. Laurophyll or lauroid leaves are characterized by a generous layer of wax, making them glossy in appearance, and narrow, pointed oval in shape with an 'apical mucro', or 'drip tip', which permits the leaves to shed water despite the humidity, allowing respiration from plant.

Mostly, the plants present a distinct odor. Their alternate leaves are ovate-elliptic, with margins entire or occasionally repand, with acute apices and broadly cuneate to subrounded bases. Upper leaf surfaces are shiny green to yellowish-green, while the undersides are opaque and lighter in color. Mature leaves are dark green. Young leaves are reddish brown to yellowish-red. The leaves are glabrous on both surfaces or sparsely puberulent beneath only when young; the leaves are mostly triplinerved or sometimes inconspicuously five-nerved, with conspicuous midrib on both surfaces. The axils of lateral nerves and veins are conspicuously bullate above and dome-shaped. Terminal buds are perulate.

The axillary panicle is 3.5–7 cm long. It is a genus of monoecious species, with hermaphrodite flowers, greenish white, white to yellow are glabrous or downy and pale to yellowish brown. Mostly the flowers are small. The perianth is glabrous or puberulent outside and densely pubescent inside. The purplish-black fruit is an ovate, ellipsoidal or subglobose drupe. The perianth-cup in fruit is cupuliform.

Cinnamomum parthenoxylon and Cinnamomum camphora are large evergreen trees that can grow to 30 m in height with trunks 3 m in diameter, with broadly ovate crowns. Terminal buds are broadly ovoid or globular, and covered with sericeous scales. Bark is yellowish-brown with irregular vertical splits. Branches are light brown, cylindrical, and glabrous.

The inner bark of several species is used to make the spice cinnamon. Other notable species are C. tamala, used as the herb malabathrum (also called tejpat and Indian bay leaf), and C. camphora, from which camphor is produced.

Accepted species
About 250 species are accepted, including several commercially important ones.

A molecular study found that species from the tropical Americas classed in Cinnamomum were not closely related to the Paleotropical species, and have been reclassified with related species in genus Aiouea.

Cinnamomum agasthyamalayanum
Cinnamomum alibertii
Cinnamomum alternifolium
Cinnamomum altissimum
Cinnamomum anacardium
Cinnamomum andersonii
Cinnamomum angustifolium
Cinnamomum angustitepalum
Cinnamomum appelianum
Cinnamomum archboldianum
Cinnamomum arfakense
Cinnamomum aromaticum – Chinese cinnamon or cassia (C. cassia) 
Cinnamomum asomicum
Cinnamomum assamicum
Cinnamomum aubletii
Cinnamomum aureofulvum
Cinnamomum auricolor
Cinnamomum austrosinense
Cinnamomum austroyunnanense'''Cinnamomum baileyanumCinnamomum bailloniiCinnamomum balansaeCinnamomum bamoenseCinnamomum beccariiCinnamomum bejolghotaCinnamomum bhamoensisCinnamomum bhaskariiCinnamomum birmanicumCinnamomum bishnupadaeCinnamomum blandfordiiCinnamomum blumeiCinnamomum bokorenseCinnamomum boniiCinnamomum brachythyrsumCinnamomum burmannii – Indonesian cinnamonCinnamomum calciphilumCinnamomum cambodianumCinnamomum capparu-corondeCinnamomum carriereiCinnamomum caryophyllusCinnamomum cebuenseCinnamomum celebicumCinnamomum chagoCinnamomum champokianumCinnamomum chantiniiCinnamomum chemungianumCinnamomum citriodorum – Malabar cinnamonCinnamomum clemensiiCinnamomum contractumCinnamomum cordatumCinnamomum corneriCinnamomum crassinerviumCinnamomum crenulicupulumCinnamomum culilawanCinnamomum cupulatumCinnamomum curvifoliumCinnamomum cuspidatumCinnamomum damhaenseCinnamomum daphnoidesCinnamomum decaisneiCinnamomum decourtilzillCinnamomum degeneriCinnamomum deschampsiiCinnamomum dimorphandrumCinnamomum doederleiniiCinnamomum dominiiCinnamomum dubium – Wild cinnamonCinnamomum durifoliumCinnamomum x durifruticeticolaCinnamomum eboaloiCinnamomum ellipticifoliumCinnamomum englerianumCinnamomum eugenoliferumCinnamomum filipedicellatumCinnamomum fitianumCinnamomum gambleiCinnamomum gaudichaudiiCinnamomum glaucescensCinnamomum glauciphyllumCinnamomum goaenseCinnamomum gracillimumCinnamomum helferiCinnamomum heyneanumCinnamomum hkinlumenseCinnamomum hookeriCinnamomum impressinerviumCinnamomum inconspicuumCinnamomum inersCinnamomum insularimontanumCinnamomum javanicumCinnamomum jensenianumCinnamomum kalbaricumCinnamomum kamiCinnamomum kanehirae – stout camphor tree niu zhang; endemic to TaiwanCinnamomum keralaenseCinnamomum kerangasCinnamomum kerriiCinnamomum kinabaluenseCinnamomum kingdon-wardiiCinnamomum kotoenseCinnamomum kunstleriCinnamomum kwangtungenseCinnamomum lanaoeenseCinnamomum lanuginosumCinnamomum laubatiiCinnamomum lawangCinnamomum ledermanniiCinnamomum liangiiCinnamomum ligneumCinnamomum lineatumCinnamomum liouiCinnamomum litsaeifoliumCinnamomum loheriCinnamomum lohitensisCinnamomum longipedicellatumCinnamomum loureiroi – Saigon cinnamonCinnamomum lucensCinnamomum mabberleyiCinnamomum macrocarpumCinnamomum macrophyllumCinnamomum magnificumCinnamomum maireiCinnamomum malabatrumCinnamomum melastomaceumCinnamomum melliodorumCinnamomum mendozaeCinnamomum mercadoi S.Vidal – kalingag treeCinnamomum microphyllumCinnamomum mohanenseCinnamomum mollissiumumCinnamomum myrianthumCinnamomum nalingwayCinnamomum nanophyllumCinnamomum neesiiCinnamomum nilagricumCinnamomum novae-britanniaeCinnamomum oblongumCinnamomum obscurumCinnamomum oliveriCinnamomum osmophloeum – pseudocinnamomumCinnamomum ovalifoliumCinnamomum pachypesCinnamomum pachyphyllumCinnamomum paieiCinnamomum pallidumCinnamomum panayenseCinnamomum paraneuronCinnamomum pedatinerviumCinnamomum pendulumCinnamomum percoriaceumCinnamomum perglabrumCinnamomum perrottetiiCinnamomum pilosumCinnamomum pingbienenseCinnamomum piniodorumCinnamomum pittosporoidesCinnamomum podagricumCinnamomum polderiCinnamomum politumCinnamomum polyadelphiumCinnamomum porphyrospermumCinnamomum propinquumCinnamomum pseudopedunculatumCinnamomum puberulumCinnamomum racemosumCinnamomum reticulatumCinnamomum rigidissimumCinnamomum rigidumCinnamomum ripariumCinnamomum rivulorumCinnamomum rosiflorumCinnamomum rosselianumCinnamomum rumphiiCinnamomum rupestreCinnamomum sancti-caroliCinnamomum sandkuhliiCinnamomum sanjappaeCinnamomum saxatileCinnamomum scalarinerviumCinnamomum scortechiniiCinnamomum selangorenseCinnamomum sericansCinnamomum sessilifoliumCinnamomum siamenseCinnamomum sieboldiiCinnamomum sinharajaenseCinnamomum sintoc BlumeCinnamomum sleumeriCinnamomum solomonenseCinnamomum splendensCinnamomum spuriumCinnamomum subaveniopsisCinnamomum sublanuginosumCinnamomum subsericeumCinnamomum subtetrapterumCinnamomum sulavesianumCinnamomum sulphuratumCinnamomum sumatranumCinnamomum suvraeCinnamomum szechuanenseCinnamomum tahijanumCinnamomum talawaenseCinnamomum tamala – tejpat, Indian bay leaf, or malabathrumCinnamomum tavoyanumCinnamomum taziaCinnamomum tenuifolium – Japanese cinnamonCinnamomum tetragonumCinnamomum travancoricumCinnamomum trichophyllumCinnamomum trinervatumCinnamomum tsangiiCinnamomum utileCinnamomum vaccinifoliumCinnamomum validinerveCinnamomum verum – cinnamon, Ceylon cinnamon, or true cinnamonCinnamomum villosulumCinnamomum vimineumCinnamomum virens – red-barked sassafras, eastern AustraliaCinnamomum vitienseCinnamomum walaiwarenseCinnamomum wightiiCinnamomum wilsoniiCinnamomum woulfeiCinnamomum xanthoneurumCinnamomum yabunikkeiSpecies transferred to Camphora: Camphora bodinieri ≡ Cinnamomum bodinieriCamphora brachythyrsa ≡ Cinnamomum brachythyrsumCamphora chartophylla ≡ Cinnamomum chartophyllumCamphora foveolata ≡ Cinnamomum foveolatumCamphora glandulifera ≡ Cinnamomum glanduliferumCamphora illicioides ≡ Cinnamomum ilicioidesCamphora longepaniculata ≡ Cinnamomum longepaniculatumCamphora micrantha ≡ Cinnamomum micranthumCamphora migao ≡ Cinnamomum migaoCamphora mollifolia ≡ Cinnamomum mollifoliumCamphora officinarum ≡ Cinnamomum camphora – camphor laurelCamphora parthenoxylon ≡ Cinnamomum parthenoxylon – Selasian wood, Martaban camphor wood, saffrol laurel, alcanforero amarillo, mreah prew phnom, kayu gadis, telasihan, huang zhangCamphora philippinensis ≡ Cinnamomum philippinenseCamphora platyphylla ≡ Cinnamomum platyphyllumCamphora purpurea ≡ Cinnamomum purpureumCamphora rufotomentosa ≡ Cinnamomum rufomentosumCamphora septentrionalis ≡ Cinnamomum septentrionaleCamphora tenuipilis ≡ Cinnamomum tenuipile''

References

External links
Cinnamomum page on Wikispecies

 
Lauraceae genera